Northwood University (NU) is a private university focused on business education with its main campus in Midland, Michigan. Opened in 1959, more than 33,000 people have graduated from the institution.

History
Northwood University opened as Northwood Institute in 1959 by Arthur E. Turner and R. Gary Stauffer. One hundred students enrolled at the new school, which was initially located in a 19th-century mansion in Alma, Michigan. Northwood Institute moved to Midland, Michigan, in 1961.

The Jesuits operated a seminary known as West Baden College at the former West Baden Springs Hotel, in Orange County, Indiana, from 1934 until June 1964, when declining enrollment forced the closure of the facility. They sold the property to a Michigan couple, who in turn donated it to Northwood Institute, which operated a satellite campus of their business management school under the great dome on the property from 1966 until 1983, when it was closed. During the same time frame during which the Indiana campus was opened, a Northwood facility was also established in Texas, which continues to serve students in the Southwest United States.

In 1982, David E. Fry became president of the school. The Florida residential campus was added and the academic curricula was expanded. The school was accredited by the Higher Learning Commission.

In 1993, the name was changed from Northwood Institute to Northwood University and The DeVos Graduate School of Management was created. A joint program with the Hotel Institute Montreux was established in 2001 to combine Swiss hospitality traditions with American management practices. The school, located in Montreux, Switzerland was Northwood University's first international venture. University College program centers were expanded for a total of 40 locations in eight states and program centers were begun in Bahrain, People's Republic of China, Sri Lanka, and Switzerland.

In October 2007, Keith A. Pretty was named Northwood's third President and CEO. Kent MacDonald became president in 2019.

In 2014, Northwood announced that it would close its residential operations at its Texas location, while continuing to expand its adult degree program and graduate program there. A year later in 2015, the university sold its Florida location to Keiser University.

Academics

Northwood focuses on business education. Its most popular undergraduate majors, based on 2021 graduates (including by distance learning), were:
Business Administration and Management (343)
Accounting (108)
Marketing/Marketing Management (79)
Vehicle & Vehicle Parts & Accessories Marketing Operations (47)
Finance (39)
Management Science (24)
Sport & Fitness Administration/Management (22)

Athletics

Current campuses

Michigan Timberwolves

The athletic teams of Northwood University's Michigan (main) campus are called the Timberwolves. The campus is a member of the NCAA Division II ranks, primarily competing in the Great Midwest Athletic Conference (G-MAC) since the 2022–23 academic year. The Timberwolves previously competed in the Great Lakes Intercollegiate Athletic Conference (GLIAC) from 1972–73 to 1986–87, and again from 1992–93 to 2021–22.

Northwood competes in 16 varsity sports: Men's sports include baseball, basketball, cross country, football, golf, soccer, tennis, and track & field; while women's sports include basketball, cross country, golf, soccer, softball, tennis, track & field, and volleyball. Club sports include men's ice hockey.

On April 29, 2021, Northwood announced that it will leave the GLIAC to join the G-MAC in July 2022.

Former campuses

Texas Knights
The athletic teams of Northwood University's Texas campus were called the Knights. The campus was a member of the National Association of Intercollegiate Athletics (NAIA); primarily competing in the Sooner Athletic Conference (SAC) for the 2013–14 academic year. They also competed in the Red River Athletic Conference (RRAC) from 1998–99 to 2012–13.

Northwood–Texas competed in 12 intercollegiate varsity sports: Men's sports included baseball, basketball, cross country, golf, soccer, and track & field; while women's sports included basketball, cross country, golf, soccer, softball, and track & field.

Florida Seahawks
The athletic teams of Northwood University's Florida campus were called the Seahawks. The campus was a member of the National Association of Intercollegiate Athletics (NAIA); primarily competing in the Sun Conference (formerly known as the Florida Sun Conference (FSC) until after the 2007–08 school year) from 1994–95 to 2014–15.

Northwood–Florida competed in 12 intercollegiate varsity sports: Men's sports included baseball, basketball, golf, soccer, and tennis; while women's sports included basketball, cheerleading, golf, soccer, softball, tennis, and volleyball.

Notable alumni
 Jeffrey Ajluni, businessman
 Robb Brent, NASCAR/ARCA driver
 Julie Calley, politician and former Second lady from Michigan
 Rob Childress, college baseball coach
 Dick DeVos, 2006 Michigan GOP gubernatorial candidate, son of Amway co-founder
 Dan DeVos, American businessman and sports executive
 Carole Gist, Miss USA 1990
Rina Mohd Harun, Malaysian politician.
 Charleston Hughes, Canadian Football League All-Star defensive linemen and Grey Cup champion
 Maurice Jones, NBL Canada player, 2017 NBL Canada Rookie of the Year
 Jose Jono Jumamoy, Former Municipal Mayor of Inabanga, Bohol, Philippines
 Blake Koch, NASCAR driver
Lisa McClain, Representative of Michigan's 10th congressional district
 Jermaine Middleton, former basketball player for the Harlem Globetrotters
 Candice Miller, Member of the U.S. House of Representatives
 Jerry Pettway, American Basketball Association, Houston Mavericks guard
Deborah Renshaw, NASCAR driver
Jim Stamas, businessman and politician
 Chris Wilson, Washington Redskins defensive end
 Ernie Zeigler, college basketball coach

References

External links

 Official website
 Official athletics website

 
Educational institutions established in 1959
Midland, Michigan
Private universities and colleges in Michigan
Education in Midland County, Michigan
Buildings and structures in Midland County, Michigan
1959 establishments in Michigan
Private universities and colleges in Texas